Johnny Rosenblatt Stadium was a baseball stadium in Omaha, Nebraska, the former home to the annual NCAA Division I College World Series and the minor league Omaha Royals, now known as the Omaha Storm Chasers. Rosenblatt Stadium was the largest minor league baseball stadium in the United States until its demolition (Sahlen Field now holds the record).

The final College World Series game at Rosenblatt Stadium was played on June 29, 2010. The final game for the Royals in the stadium, and under the Royals name, was played on September 2, 2010, with the Royals defeating the Round Rock Express. The Omaha Nighthawks played their 2010 season at Rosenblatt.

Following those events, Rosenblatt was replaced by TD Ameritrade Park Omaha. Rosenblatt Stadium began renovation in late July (after being reopened during the 2012 College World Series for fans to visit again).  The pressbox girders were imploded on the morning of August 22, 2012. Re-construction of Rosenblatt in playground-esque form began in March 2013, and was officially opened by Mayor Jim Suttle on June 7, 2013. The site is currently owned by the Henry Doorly Zoo and Aquarium.

Professional baseball history
Omaha Municipal Stadium was built during 1947–1948, and was ready to host the single-A Omaha Cardinals for the 1949 season. The Omaha Cardinals had spent the 1947 and 1948 seasons playing their home games across the Missouri River, at the American Legion Park in Council Bluffs, Iowa. The Cards opened the new Omaha ballpark on April 25, 1949, defeating Des Moines 9-8 in 12 innings.[Lincoln Nebraska State Journal, April 26, 1949, p.9]

Over the next few years the ballpark hosted clubs in several different leagues. In 1969, the Kansas City Royals moved their triple-A franchise here, which played at Rosenblatt through the 2010 season.

In 1964, the stadium was renamed to honor former Omaha mayor Johnny Rosenblatt, who was instrumental in bringing professional baseball as well as the College World Series to Omaha.

Omaha teams

Team moved into Pacific Coast League (PCL) in 1998, after the AA folded.

Team was named "Omaha Golden Spikes" during 1998–2001.

Rosenblatt and the College World Series
From 1950 to 2010 Rosenblatt Stadium was home to the College World Series.  After the initial contract between the NCAA and the City of Omaha expired, the parties quickly agreed to renew.  Currently, the NCAA and the city of Omaha have agreed to continue hosting the Men's College World Series in Omaha through the 2035 season.  The South Carolina Gamecocks won the last college World Series in the stadium.

Due to growth in the event, the City of Omaha devoted resources to the stadium to accommodate teams and fans. In 2001, for example, more than $7 million was spent on the stadium.  One of the major additions was 10,000 new seats, bringing the total capacity to 23,145.

The record for most consecutive sell-outs at Rosenblatt stands at 82 consecutive games.   In 2002, the College World Series surpassed the 5 million spectator mark in all-time attendance.

In 1999, the local event organizers, College World Series of Omaha, Inc., placed the sculpture "Road to Omaha" in front of the main entrance. Created by local artist John Lajba, the sculpture shows three players celebrating by lifting one of their teammates in the air. One of the players whose likeness was used to create the statue (far right) is the current University of Virginia head coach Brian O'Connor. O'Connor is a native of Council Bluffs, Iowa and was a CWS participant as a pitcher for Creighton in '91, as an assistant with Notre Dame in '02, and with Virginia as their head coach in 2009 and 2011.

With the anticipated opening of TD Ameritrade Park Omaha in 2011, the College World Series moved to this new stadium, and the renamed Storm Chasers moved to Werner Park in Sarpy County.

Rosenblatt and the Omaha Royals

Although the stadium's size was not an issue for the College World Series, expansions over the years made it far too large for a Triple-A team.  In its final configuration, it had over 5,000 more seats than the next-largest stadium, Buffalo's Sahlen Field.  The Royals struggled for years to fill it for regular season games. In the stadium's final years, capacity was reduced to 8,500 for Royals games.  During the CWS, the Royals were forced to go on an extended road trip for much of June.

There had been discussion since 2003 of building a separate venue for the Royals, which also could have been shared by Creighton University and/or the University of Nebraska at Omaha.  Royals president and part owner Alan Stein stated he would be willing to invest $10 million into a new 7,500 seat stadium for the Royals. Although initial plans called for TD Ameritrade Park to be reduced to 12,000 seats for Royals games, Stein said that would not be a viable alternative, presumably because the Royals would have still had to go on an extended road trip in June during the CWS. The Royals believed that a smaller, more intimate stadium would double annual attendance up to 500,000–600,000. According to Stein, that increase would have been unlikely at either Rosenblatt or a large downtown stadium.

The Royals had named multiple other cities with whom they have discussed stadium relocation, but decided to stay in greater Omaha with the construction of Werner Park in Sarpy County.

Efforts to save Rosenblatt Stadium
In May 2007 a grassroots organization called "Save Rosenblatt" tried to save the stadium for the use by College World Series. The group aired a TV commercial with actor Kevin Costner and proposed architectural plans for a renovation of Rosenblatt.  The group also created an informational website. The group was composed primarily of governmental spending critics and homeowners near Rosenblatt Stadium who stood to lose money from the loss of proximity of the College World Series.

The members of "Save Rosenblatt" believed that Rosenblatt Stadium should be retained and enhanced, saying that the CWS and the City of Omaha would have been better served by a remodeled Rosenblatt and modified area around the stadium. However, on February 27, 2008, after nearly five months of deliberation, Omaha Mayor Mike Fahey and the stadium committee made a public recommendation for a new downtown stadium. This proposal included plans for the demolition of Rosenblatt Stadium. Many citizens of South Omaha responded with disappointment and frustration over the lack of public participation in the project planning and a lack of a public vote on a multimillion-dollar project. Other concerns focused on the financing and certainty of the construction costs of the new stadium.

In response, fans have begun a movement to build an online museum of Rosenblatt Stadium.

New agreement
On April 30, 2009, the city and the NCAA agreed on a memorandum of understanding, outlining a preliminary agreement to keep the World Series in Omaha for another 25 years through 2035. The agreement stipulated that the series be moved to the new downtown stadium by 2011.

Omaha Nighthawks
On April 15, 2010, it was announced that Rosenblatt Stadium would be home to the Omaha Nighthawks in the United Football League for its inaugural 2010 season. For 2011 and beyond, the Nighthawks would move into the new TD Ameritrade Park.

The Nighthawks played four games at Rosenblatt Stadium during the 2010 UFL season, selling out all four, the only UFL team to do so. The league was so impressed by the attendance that they awarded the 2010 UFL Championship Game to Rosenblatt, which was the last sporting event ever held there.

2011–present: Future use and remodeling
Rosenblatt held tractor pulls and tributes to its legacy through 2011. In June 2012, the Omaha Henry Doorly Zoo Foundation opened Rosenblatt to the public during the 2012 College World Series. Plans called for the site of Rosenblatt Stadium to be sold to pay off the debt remaining from the stadium's multimillion-dollar updates. The adjacent Henry Doorly Zoo purchased control of the land and remodeled Rosenblatt once the new downtown stadium was completed. A tribute to Rosenblatt, sized to Little League standards, will be the product of the renovations to Rosenblatt. On March 8, 2011, the Omaha City Council formally approved the sale of Rosenblatt to the Zoo for $12 million. Renovation of Rosenblatt began in July 2012; the city of Omaha will use the money gained from Rosenblatt's sale to pay off debts which had been incurred in the stadium's updates over the years. On June 7, 2013, the Zoo unveiled the tribute to the stadium, Rosenblatt Park.

Atmosphere
Johnny Rosenblatt Stadium was one of the few stadiums to still use live music instead of prerecorded music. Lambert Bartak, an organist for the Royals, is one of only three organists ever to be ejected during a game, the others being Wilbur Snapp and Derek Dye.

The playing field in Rosenblatt Stadium had the ability to stay playable with even an 8.5 inch per hour rainfall.

Earlier dimensions

Gallery

See also
TD Ameritrade Park Omaha – ballpark that replaced Rosenblatt Stadium as home of the College World Series and the Nighthawks in 2011
Werner Park – ballpark that replaced Rosenblatt Stadium as home of the Royals in 2011

References

External links

Rosenblatt Stadium – History of the ballpark
Johnny Rosenblatt Stadium Views – Ball Parks of the Minor Leagues

Defunct college baseball venues in the United States
Minor league baseball venues
Sports venues in Omaha, Nebraska
College World Series venues
United Football League (2009–2012) venues
Omaha Nighthawks stadiums
Baseball venues in Nebraska
Defunct sports venues in Nebraska
1948 establishments in Nebraska
Sports venues completed in 1948
2010 disestablishments in Nebraska
Sports venues demolished in 2012
American football venues in Nebraska
Demolished buildings and structures in Omaha, Nebraska
Demolished sports venues in the United States